Tomory Dodge is an American artist. He graduated from the California Institute of the Arts in Valencia, California, in 2004. Before that, he had a solo show at the Taxter & Spengemann gallery in New York. He paints landscapes with a Surrealist influence, the paint applied broadly with a brush or palette-knife.

References

Further reading 
Tomory Dodge, CRG Gallery, NY / ACME., Los Angeles (2008) – 
Tomory Dodge: Works On Paper, CRG Gallery, NY / ACME., Los Angeles (2009) – 
Bob Nickas, Painting Abstraction: New Elements in Abstract Painting, Phaidon Press, New York (2009) – 
Kurt Beers, 100 Painters of Tomorrow, Thames and Hudson, London (2014) – 

Living people
20th-century American painters
American male painters
21st-century American painters
Postmodern artists
Artists from Denver
Artists from Los Angeles
Year of birth missing (living people)
20th-century American male artists